Borel is a surname. Notable people with the surname include:

Adrien Borel (1886–1966), psychiatrist and psychoanalyst
Aldo Borel (1912–1979), Italian football player
André Borel d'Hauterive (1812–1896), French historian
Armand Borel (1923–2003), Swiss mathematician
Calvin Borel, American jockey
Cleopatra Borel (born 1979), Trinidadian athlete
Daniel Borel (born 1950), Swiss engineer
Émile Borel (1871–1956), French mathematician and politician
Éric Borel (1978–1995), French serial killer
Ernesto Borel (1889–1951), Italian footballer
Eugène Borel (1835–1892), Swiss politician
Felice Borel (1914–1993), Italian footballer
Frédéric Borel (born 1959), French architect 
Gabriel Borel, French aircraft designer
George Frederik Willem Borel, Dutch military figure
Henri Borel, Dutch writer, son of George Frederik Willem Borel
Jacques Borel, French novelist
Jean-Louis Borel (1809–1884), French general
Marguerite Borel (1883–1969), French femme de lettres
Nego do Borel (born 1992), Brazilian singer
Pascal Borel (born 1978), German footballer and manager
Petrus Borel (1809–1859), French poet
Pierre Borel (1620–1689), French chemist, physician and naturalist
Raymond Borel, French physician
Suzanne Borel (1904–1995), French diplomat
Yannick Borel (born 1988), French fencer

See also
Louis Fauche-Borel (1726–1829), Swiss politician